Nina Gold is a casting director known for her work on the HBO series Rome and Game of Thrones. She has also worked as casting director in movies like The Martian, Star Wars: The Force Awakens, Star Wars: The Last Jedi, and Solo: A Star Wars Story.

Career
Gold began casting while at university, studying at Christ's College, University of Cambridge. Her first casting job was to recruit extras for an AC/DC music video. After spending several years casting for music videos and commercials, Gold cast a McDonald's commercial directed by Mike Leigh in 1992. Seven years later, Leigh hired Gold to cast Topsy-Turvy, her first major film. Gold has been responsible for the casting of roles in seven of Mike Leigh's films since 1999.

After casting the HBO series Rome, Gold was hired in 2009 by David Benioff and D. B. Weiss to cast a new HBO series, Game of Thrones, alongside Robert Sterne.

Awards and nominations
Gold has won and been nominated for numerous awards for Game of Thrones, including a Primetime Emmy Award for Outstanding Casting for a Drama Series win in 2015-2016 and 2019 and Emmy nominations for all six seasons. In 2015, she and Sterne were also nominated for an Emmy for casting the miniseries Wolf Hall. In 2014, Gold was nominated for a Casting Society of America award for her work on the film The Theory of Everything. In 2016, Gold was awarded a BAFTA Special Award at the Television Craft Awards for her career in casting for television and film. In 2019, she was nominated for the inaugural BAFTA Award for Best Casting for The Two Popes.

Personal life
Gold's partner is Frank Hewetson, a logistics coordinator for Greenpeace. They have two children together.

Filmography

Selected television credits

Selected film credits

References

External links 

Living people
British casting directors
Women casting directors
Primetime Emmy Award winners
Alumni of Christ's College, Cambridge
WFTV Award winners
Year of birth missing (living people)